Clearwater is an unincorporated community in Franklin County, Texas, United States.

History
The community was named for the clear waters in the nearby Cypress Creek. White settlers arrived in the 1860s, but the community itself did not appear until the next decade. There was a sawmill, a gin, a store, and a church in the community in the 1930s. Its population was 25 in 1933, which grew to 50 in 1945. The community had a church, a cemetery, and several scattered homes in 1985.

Geography
It was originally located between Cypress Creek and Dry Cypress Creek, but the streams were held back by Lake Cypress Springs and Lake Bob Sandlin.

Education
The community had its own school in the 1930s. Today, Clearwater is served by the Mount Vernon Independent School District.

In popular culture
 The 1965 western film the Sons of Katie Elder, starring John Wayne and Dean Martin, is set in Clearwater in 1898. It, however, was actually filmed mostly in northern Mexico.
 In the 2003 American Christian film, Christmas Child (based on Max Lucado's 1998 short story "The Christmas Cross", repackaged in 2003 as The Christmas Child: A Story of Coming Home), a Chicago journalist travels to Clearwater around Christmas time to discover his past.
Texas playwright Cody Moree set his first and most popular stage play, Her Senior Year, (1998 I.E. Clark / Dramatic Publishing Company) in Clearwater, Texas.  Another play written by Moree, A Long Way To Memphis, takes place in the offices of Clearwater Real Estate, in Clearwater, Texas.

References

Unincorporated communities in Franklin County, Texas
Unincorporated communities in Texas